Janet Anderson (1949–2023) is a British politician.

Janet Anderson may also refer to:
Janet Anderson (golfer) (born 1956), American golf player
Janet M. Anderson (1949–1996), American commercial artist
Janet Anderson Perkin (1921–2012), Canadian professional baseball player and curler

See also
 Jan Anderson (disambiguation)